Saubraz is a municipality in Switzerland. It is located in the district of Morges, in the canton of Vaud.

History
Saubraz is first mentioned in the 13th century as de Salubra.  In 1251 it was mentioned as Saubra. The town formed around a church, which belonged to the Premonstratensian Abbey Lac-de-Joux (L’Abbaye) and burned down in 1251. After Bern conquered Vaud in 1536, Saubraz shared in the fate of Aubonne and 1701 it became a part of the Aubonne administrative district. After the breaking up of the Ancien régime the town was a part of the canton Léman from 1798 to 1803 during the Helvetic Republic. It subsequently was absorbed by the canton of Vaud and in 1798 assigned to the district of Aubonne.

The chapel which had been built on the ruins of the medieval church was cleared away during the building of a school house in 1899. Today Saubraz is part of the Gimel parish.

Geography

Of this area,  or 46.2% is used for agricultural purposes, while  or 45.7% is forested.

Of the built up area, housing and buildings made up 1.6% and transportation infrastructure made up 2.2%.  Power and water infrastructure as well as other special developed areas made up 2.7% of the area  Out of the forested land, 43.8% of the total land area is heavily forested and 1.9% is covered with orchards or small clusters of trees.  Of the agricultural land, 32.4% is used for growing crops and 13.0% is pastures.  All the water in the municipality is flowing water.

The municipality was part of the Aubonne District until it was dissolved on 31 August 2006, and Saubraz became part of the new district of Morges.

The municipality is located at the foot of the Jura Mountains near the Col du Marchairuz road.

It is a farming village sprawled across a plateau in the Jura Mountains between the valleys of Saubrett in the south and Toleure in the north.

The creek Saubrett and its tributary Toluere drain the eastern part of the area into the Aubonne river. Toleure forms the northern boundary of the municipality. The plateau Saubraz is located between the two creeks; it gradually rises to the Jura Mountains in the northwest. The highest point in Saubraz is located at  AMSL at the foot of Mont Chaubert. In the south, the municipality's woodland area Bois des Ursins rises to the Ursins Plateau.

The municipalities Gimel, Montherod and Bière border Saubraz.

Coat of arms
The blazon of the municipal coat of arms is Per pale Gules and Or, overall a Crane Argent, in Canton a Mullet of Five of the second.

Demographics
, 17.4% of the population are resident foreign nationals. Over the last 10 years (1999-2009 ) the population has changed at a rate of 77.7%. It has changed at a rate of 72.1% due to migration and at a rate of 5.1% due to births and deaths.

Most of the population speaks French (179 or 90.4%), with German being second most common (9 or 4.5%) and Portuguese being third (7 or 3.5%).  There is 1 person who speaks Italian.

Of the population in the municipality 61 or about 30.8% were born in Saubraz and lived there in 2000.  There were 61 or 30.8% who were born in the same canton, while 31 or 15.7% were born somewhere else in Switzerland, and 42 or 21.2% were born outside of Switzerland.

In  there were 3 live births to Swiss citizens and were 5 deaths of Swiss citizens.  Ignoring immigration and emigration, the population of Swiss citizens decreased by 2 while the foreign population remained the same.  There were 2 non-Swiss men and 1 non-Swiss woman who immigrated from another country to Switzerland.  The total Swiss population change in 2008 (from all sources, including moves across municipal borders) was an increase of 9 and the non-Swiss population increased by 10 people.  This represents a population growth rate of 6.3%.

The age distribution, in Saubraz is; 62 children or 17.9% of the population are between 0 and 9 years old and 48 teenagers or 13.9% are between 10 and 19.  Of the adult population, 26 people or 7.5% of the population are between 20 and 29 years old.  67 people or 19.4% are between 30 and 39, 55 people or 15.9% are between 40 and 49, and 34 people or 9.8% are between 50 and 59.  The senior population distribution is 26 people or 7.5% of the population are between 60 and 69 years old, 14 people or 4.0% are between 70 and 79, there are 10 people or 2.9% who are between 80 and 89, and there are 4 people or 1.2% who are 90 and older.

, there were 72 people who were single and never married in the municipality.  There were 99 married individuals, 15 widows or widowers and 12 individuals who are divorced.

, there were 88 private households in the municipality, and an average of 2.2 persons per household.  There were 28 households that consist of only one person and 2 households with five or more people.  Out of a total of 90 households that answered this question, 31.1% were households made up of just one person and there were 2 adults who lived with their parents.  Of the rest of the households, there are 26 married couples without children, 27 married couples with children  There were 3 single parents with a child or children.  There were 2 households that were made up of unrelated people and 2 households that were made up of some sort of institution or another collective housing.

 there were 27 single family homes (or 45.0% of the total) out of a total of 60 inhabited buildings.  There were 12 multi-family buildings (20.0%), along with 16 multi-purpose buildings that were mostly used for housing (26.7%) and 5 other use buildings (commercial or industrial) that also had some housing (8.3%).  Of the single family homes 18 were built before 1919, while 2 were built between 1990 and 2000.  The most multi-family homes (9) were built before 1919 and the next most (1) were built between 1961 and 1970.

 there were 105 apartments in the municipality.  The most common apartment size was 3 rooms of which there were 30.  There were 4 single room apartments and 31 apartments with five or more rooms.  Of these apartments, a total of 87 apartments (82.9% of the total) were permanently occupied, while 13 apartments (12.4%) were seasonally occupied and 5 apartments (4.8%) were empty.  , the construction rate of new housing units was 25.7 new units per 1000 residents.  The vacancy rate for the municipality, was 0%.

The historical population is given in the following chart:

Politics
In the 2007 federal election the most popular party was the SVP which received 48.52% of the vote.  The next three most popular parties were the SP (13.95%), the FDP (8.85%) and the Green Party (8.55%).  In the federal election, a total of 96 votes were cast, and the voter turnout was 54.5%.

Economy
Up until the second half of the 20th century Saubraz was predominately an agricultural town. Even today agriculture plays an important role, as animal husbandry, dairy production and farming are the dominant occupations. Other jobs are found in local business and the services sector. Because the town has developed into a more residential area in the last few decades, many commuters who work in the neighboring towns Gimla and Biere, as well as in the larger cities along the Lake Geneva, have left.

, Saubraz had an unemployment rate of 3.5%.  , there were 9 people employed in the primary economic sector and about 5 businesses involved in this sector.  6 people were employed in the secondary sector and there were 4 businesses in this sector.  8 people were employed in the tertiary sector, with 5 businesses in this sector.  There were 109 residents of the municipality who were employed in some capacity, of which females made up 43.1% of the workforce.

 the total number of full-time equivalent jobs was 19.  The number of jobs in the primary sector was 6, all of which were in agriculture.  The number of jobs in the secondary sector was 6 of which 4 or (66.7%) were in manufacturing and 2 (33.3%) were in construction.  The number of jobs in the tertiary sector was 7.  In the tertiary sector; 3 or 42.9% were in wholesale or retail sales or the repair of motor vehicles, 1 was a technical professional or scientist, 2 or 28.6% were in education.

, there were 4 workers who commuted into the municipality and 80 workers who commuted away.  The municipality is a net exporter of workers, with about 20.0 workers leaving the municipality for every one entering.  Of the working population, 7.3% used public transportation to get to work, and 65.1% used a private car.

Religion
There was 1 individual who belongs to another Christian church. There were 3 (or about 1.52% of the population) who were Islamic.  32 (or about 16.16% of the population) belonged to no church, are agnostic or atheist, and 8 individuals (or about 4.04% of the population) did not answer the question.

Education
In Saubraz about 81 or (40.9%) of the population have completed non-mandatory upper secondary education, and 22 or (11.1%) have completed additional higher education (either university or a Fachhochschule).  Of the 22 who completed tertiary schooling, 59.1% were Swiss men, 22.7% were Swiss women.

In the 2009/2010 school year there were a total of 66 students in the Saubraz school district.  In the Vaud cantonal school system, two years of non-obligatory pre-school are provided by the political districts.  During the school year, the political district provided pre-school care for a total of 631 children of which 203 children (32.2%) received subsidized pre-school care.  The canton's primary school program requires students to attend for four years.  There were 42 students in the municipal primary school program.  The obligatory lower secondary school program lasts for six years and there were 24 students in those schools.

, there were 15 students in Saubraz who came from another municipality, while 21 residents attended schools outside the municipality.

Transportation
Saubraz is located away from the larger thoroughfares; the main access road comes from Aubonne. Saubraz is connected to the public transport network, by way of the postal service’s routes, which run from Gimel, via Bière, to L'Isle.

References

External links

Official website (in French)
Flag
Aerial photos